This list comprises all players who have participated in at least one league match for Fort Lauderdale Strikers first season in the North American Soccer League since 2011. Players who were on the roster but never played a first team game are not listed.

A "†" denotes players who only appeared in a single match.

A
  Rafael Alves
  Mark Anderson
  José Angulo
  Stefan Antonijevic
  Daniel Arcila
  Bryan Arguez
  Cristian Arrieta
  Jeff Attinella

B
  Bradlee Baladez
  Nickardo Blake
  Christian Blandon†
  Jonathan Borrajo
  Jenison Brito
  Lionel Brown

C
  Justin Chavez
  Shawn Chin
  Nico Clavijo†
  Kamil Čontofalský
  Eduardo Coudet

D
  Gonzalo De Mujica
  Mike Dietze†
  Stefan Dimitrov

E
  Marius Ebbers

F
  David Foley
  Josh Ford
  Marlon Freitas
  Evans Frimpong

G
  Gabriel
  Abel Gebor
  Matt Glaeser
  Manny Gonzalez
  Darryl Gordon
  Scott Gordon
  Yoximar Granado
  Jordan Graye
  Iván Guerrero
  Stéphane Guillaume

H
  Matheau Hall
  Aly Hassan
  Andy Herron
  Aaron Hohlbein

J
  Jemal Johnson

K
  Grant Kerr
  Darnell King
  Zach Kirby
  Fabian Kling

L
  Lance Laing
  Martyn Lancaster
  Cody Laurendi†
  Paulinho Le Petit
  Lennon
  Mitchell Lopez†
  Scott Lorenz

M
  Dave Martin†
  James Marcelin
  Gerson Mayen
  David Meves
  Leopoldo Morales
  Alfonso Motagalvan
  Léo Moura
  Colin Murphy

N
  Halili Nagime
  Joe Nasco†
  Daniel Navarro
  Oka Nikolov
  Bruno Nunes
  Martin Nuñez
  Chris Nurse

O
  Emilio Orozco
  Patrick Otte

P
  Mike Palacio
  Paulo Jr.
  PC
  Pecka
  Jean Philippe Peguero
  Yaikel Pérez
  Fafà Picault
  Stefano Pinho
  Nicolas Platter

Q
  Cristian Quiñones

R
  Walter Ramirez
  Hosman Ramos
  Wálter Restrepo
  Rubens

S
  Carlos Salazar
  Dani Sánchez
  Richard Sánchez
  Frankie Sanfilippo
  David Santamaria
  Conor Shanosky
  Brian Shriver
  Karsten Smith
  Toni Ståhl
  Jack Stewart

T
  Michael Tetteh
  Hendry Thomas
  Shavar Thomas
  Abe Thompson

V
  Ronaldo Vieira

W
  Kenney Walker†
  Adam West
  Jahbari Willis
  Aaron Wheeler

Sources

+
Fort Lauderdale Strikers
Association football player non-biographical articles